The Sojomerto inscription is an inscription discovered in Sojomerto village, Reban, Batang Regency, Central Java, Indonesia. Written in Old Malay using the Kawi script, it was initially dated to  the 7th century, but later redated, on palaeographic grounds, to the early 9th century. The inscription is currently in situ or on location.

The inscription is Shivaist in nature, talking about the head of a noble family named Dapunta Selendra, the son of Santanu and Bhadrawati, the husband of Sampula. Boechari speculates that Dapunta Selendra was the progenitor of the Sailendras, an influential family who would later rule Mataram and Srivijaya.

The inscription was carved on an andesite stone 43 cm wide, 7 cm thick, and 78 cm tall. The text consists of 11 lines, most of them being unclear and eroded.

Content

Transliteration

Common Malay translation

English translation

Interpretation
This inscription concluded that the family of Dapunta Selendra is settled at the north coast of Central Java, speak Old Malay and that they are Shivaist Hindus.

The discovery of this inscription has led to the development of theories proposing a Sumatran origin of the Sailendras, also with the possibility of their initial establishment at the north coast of Central Java before moving inland to Kedu Plain. Just like the Sojomerto inscription, some of Sailendra's inscriptions of the later period—although discovered in Central Java—are also written in Old Malay instead of Old Javanese, which suggested Sumatran connections. The name 'Selendra' mentioned in this inscription as "Dapunta Selendra" is suggested as the ancestor of the Sailendras. The title 'Dapunta' is similar to those of Srivijayan King Dapunta Hyang Sri Jayanasa, which suggested the Srivijayan connection to Sailendra family. The family was first settled in Central Java northern coast around Batang and Pekalongan regency, they were initially Hindu Shivaist. At a certain point of time they moved southward and established themselves in Kedu Plain and later probably converted to Mahayana Buddhism.

Another interpretation suggests that the family was probably a native Javanese family, but having Srivijayan connection. This ruling family was probably a local ruler but somehow subjugated by Srivijayan through invasion and served as Srivijayan vassal. The early Sailendras were probably belongs within Srivijaya's mandala sphere of influence. Previously known through Kota Kapur inscription (686 CE) that Srivijaya launched series of military campaign against Bhumi Java, which also corresponds to the fall of Tarumanagara kingdom in West Java.

See also
Canggal inscription (732)
Kalasan inscription (778)
Kelurak inscription (782)
Manjusrigrha inscription (792)
Karangtengah inscription (824)
Tri Tepusan inscription (842)

References

Inscriptions in Indonesia
8th-century inscriptions
Shailendra dynasty
725